Airbacktrax is the first "best-of" album by German industrial music band X Marks the Pedwalk. It was released by Zoth Ommog in Europe as both an LP and CD, and in North America by Cleopatra Records as a CD with the alternate title, Abattoir.

Track listing
 "Abattoir (Razormaid)"
 "Arbitrary Execution"
 "Look on this Side"
 "Dead Fuck"
 "Danger"
 "(God Takes A) Photograph"
 "Mirthless Knick-Knack"
 "Scythe and Limbs"
 "Abattoir (Extended)"
 "Solitude"
 "Abortion"
 "Helpless (Depressed Mix)"
 "Worthless (Sadness Mix)"
 "Dependence"

Personnel

Sevren Ni-arb
Regan Eracs

References

1994 albums
X Marks the Pedwalk albums
Cleopatra Records compilation albums
Zoth Ommog Records compilation albums